Events from the year 1540 in India.

Events
 May 17 – Sur Empire established
 Biswa Singha of Kamata rule of the Koch Kingdom comes to an end (since 1515), and Nara Narayan's begins (until 1587)

Births
 May 9 – Maharana Pratap, Hindu Rajput ruler of Mewar (died 1597)

Deaths

See also

 Timeline of Indian history